Dispatch News Service International is the news agency founded in 1968 by young journalists Michael Morrow, Dan Derby, Emerson Manawis, and actor Richard Hughes. Other reporters that either actively joined the news agency as full-time reporters, contributors, writers, artists, photo journalists and/or stringers included John Steinbeck IV, John Everingham, Sean Flynn, Don Luce, Thomas C Fox, Steve Erhart, Crystal Erhart, Gareth Porter, J.L. Rivera, Christopher Beck, Jonathan Unger, Michael Berger, D.E. Ronk, Boris Baczynskj, David Boggett and many others.

Initially focusing on in-depth reporting on the Vietnam War, DNS as it was commonly known, established its main operations in Saigon, South Vietnam. DNS had bureaus and/or representative offices in the following countries with its respective manager or representative: Taipei, Taiwan, Christine Lin; Vientiane, Laos, Crystal Eastin; Sydney, Australia, Richard Anderson, James Falk and Peter Viola; Hong Kong, Jacques Leslie; Macau, Stephen Thomas; and Bangkok, Thailand, Frank Sommerville.

In the United States, DNS had bureaus and/or representative offices in the following cities: San Francisco, Tom Donaldson and Kitty Wynn; Los Angeles, Steven Nichols, Sally Benson and Lynn, Shavelson; Boston, John Thompson; New York City, Richard Greenbaum; and Seattle, Peter Morrow.

The Washington, DC office was managed and directed by Dick Berliner, followed by Desmond McAllister, then David Obst and  later Joe Gatins. Reporters traveled extensively throughout Southeast Asia, reporting from various capitals, but its focus remained the  countries of Cambodia, Laos and Thailand.

Among the reporting distributed by DNS was Seymour Hersh's My Lai Massacre story. For his exclusive disclosure of the Vietnam War tragedy at the hamlet of My Lai, Hersh, as well as DNS, received the Pulitzer Prize for International Reporting in 1969.

Dispatch News Service International was incorporated in Manila, Philippines in 1968. The incorporators were Michael Morrow, Emerson Manawis, Mariano D. Manawis, Josefina A. Manawis and Emilie A. Manawis.

References

External links 
 

News agencies based in the United States